A series of 30 Perry Mason television films aired on NBC from 1985 to 1995 as sequels to the CBS TV series Perry Mason. After a hiatus of nearly 20 years, Raymond Burr reprised his role as Los Angeles defense attorney Mason in 26 of the television films. Following Burr's death in 1993, Paul Sorvino and Hal Holbrook starred in the remaining four television films that aired from 1993 to 1995, with Sorvino playing lawyer Anthony Caruso in the first of these and Holbrook playing "Wild Bill" McKenzie in the last three.

Production

Development
The original Perry Mason television series was broadcast on CBS television from 1957 to 1966. Raymond Burr starred as Los Angeles criminal defense lawyer Perry Mason, a character created by American author and attorney Erle Stanley Gardner. Television producer Dean Hargrove resurrected the Perry Mason character in a series of television films for NBC beginning in 1985.

Casting
Dean Hargrove was able to bring back the two then-surviving major stars, Raymond Burr and Barbara Hale, reprising their roles as Mason and his private secretary Della Street. In the first telefilm, Perry Mason Returns, Mason resigns his position as an appellate court judge to defend Street on a murder charge. William Katt, Hale's own son, was cast as private investigator Paul Drake, Jr., the son of original series’ private investigator Paul Drake. William Hopper, who played Drake, had died in 1970; his photograph appears on Paul Drake Jr.'s desk. Katt appeared in the first nine movies before being dropped from the series.

In the later TV movies, Mason utilizes the services of Ken Malansky (William R. Moses), an attorney who works with him as a private investigator. Malansky's character is introduced in The Case of the Lethal Lesson (1989), as a law student who is defended by Mason on a murder charge.

Among the actors to appear in major recurring roles were David Ogden Stiers as District Attorney Michael Reston (1986–1988), James McEachin as police Sergeant (later Lieutenant) Ed Brock (1986–1995), and Alexandra Paul as Ken Malansky's girlfriend Amy Hastings (1989).

Filming
Budgeted at $3 million, Perry Mason Returns was filmed in Toronto, standing in for Los Angeles to save production costs. Because of lower production costs, many of the later TV movies were filmed and set in Denver, Colorado rather than Mason's traditional locale of Los Angeles.  Although located in Colorado, a courtroom wall shown at the end of the opening title sequence bears a Seal of Los Angeles County, California plaque.

Music
Fred Steiner's theme music was re-recorded by composer Dick DeBenedictis; Steiner himself arranged the theme at DeBenedictis's request.

After Burr's death
A total of 30 movies were made between 1985 and 1995, with Burr starring in 26.  After Burr died in 1993, Paul Sorvino and Hal Holbrook starred in the final four telefilms from 1993 to 1995. These four films were presented as A Perry Mason Mystery, with Sorvino starring as Anthony Caruso in the first film and Holbrook starring as Bill "Wild Bill" McKenzie in the remaining three. Their characters are introduced as both lawyers and close friends of Mason, who is ostensibly out of town. Both Barbara Hale and William R. Moses reprised their roles for all four films, although in the final film in 1995, Hale contributed only a small cameo with Holland Taylor substituting for her.

Hale said that continuing the series was suggested by Burr. "Raymond was so concerned that the crew keep working - we'd been with the same crew for six years. He felt we must keep going as long as the audience was as kind to us as they are. It's the show that will keep going, but not the character. I do think it's a sweet memorial."

Television films

Raymond Burr films

A Perry Mason Mystery

Reception
Perry Mason Returns, the first television film in the series, was the second-highest-rated TV movie in American television during the 1985–86 season.

Awards
 1988: Perry Mason: The Case of the Avenging Ace received a nomination for Outstanding Achievement in Music Composition for a Miniseries or a Special (Dramatic Underscore) at the 40th Primetime Emmy Awards. The composer was Dick DeBenedictis.
 1990: Perry Mason: The Case of the Silenced Singer was nominated for Outstanding Achievement in Music and Lyrics at the 42nd Primetime Emmy Awards, for a song composed by Dick DeBenedictis.

Home media
All 30 Perry Mason television films are available on Region 1 DVD. They were released in five six-film sets that were initially available exclusively through Amazon.com. On June 7, 2016, the first four movie collections were given general retail release.

References

External links
 Perry Mason TV Series Wiki
 Perry Mason TV Showbook

1980s American drama television series
1990s American drama television series
1980s American legal television series
1990s American legal television series
1985 American television series debuts
1995 American television series endings
Film series introduced in 1985
Courtroom drama television series
American courtroom films
English-language television shows
NBC network original films
Perry Mason
Television shows set in Los Angeles
Television series by CBS Studios
Television series reunion films
Television film series